Escape into the Park was a festival held in Singleton Park, Swansea, South Wales every summer since the year 2000. It started life as a spin-off to The Escape club formerly located in Northampton Lane, Swansea (later known as Club Cuba) played host to many artists, dance DJs and focused on a dance and rave theme. From launch it was run by the club Escape, until 2005 when large clubbing group Godskitchen took over the reins.

It took 
a "rest break" in 2012 but made an epic return in 2021 at the picturesque Singleton Park, Swansea. Bringing nostalgia! Great memories and incredible DJ’s such as Cally & Juice, Chase & Status and many more, back to this professionally orchestrated and efficiently organised legendary event. Returning 2022 with a set list of Legendary DJ’s and MC’s again, larger and an increase of dance tents, lived up to the previous years Quality and success. The Original Father’s and promoters of Escape Events instantly announced 2023’s date is fixed. Looks like one of South Wales Top Dance festival has made a long awaited return, putting smiles on 80’s - 90’s baby’s all over this Beautiful Coastal City and indeed the Beautiful Wales U.K.

External links
 Official Site
 Escape Into The Park on BBC Wales

Music festivals in Wales
Summer events in Wales